Minosia is a genus of ground spiders that was first described by R. de Dalmas in 1921.

Species
 it contains thirteen species and one subspecies:
Minosia assimilis Caporiacco, 1941 – Ethiopia, Uganda
Minosia berlandi Lessert, 1929 – Congo
Minosia bicalcarata (Simon, 1882) – Yemen
Minosia clypeolaria (Simon, 1907) – Guinea-Bissau
Minosia eburneensis Jézéquel, 1965 – Ivory Coast
Minosia irrugata (Simon, 1907) – Guinea-Bissau
Minosia karakumensis (Spassky, 1939) – Turkmenistan
Minosia lynx (Simon, 1886) – Senegal
Minosia pharao Dalmas, 1921 – Egypt, Israel
Minosia p. occidentalis Dalmas, 1921 – Algeria
Minosia santschii Dalmas, 1921 – Tunisia, Libya
Minosia senegaliensis Dalmas, 1921 – Senegal
Minosia simeonica Levy, 1995 – Israel, Iran
Minosia spinosissima (Simon, 1878) (type) – Spain, France, Israel

References

Araneomorphae genera
Gnaphosidae
Spiders of Africa
Spiders of Asia